The 2002 Bulldogs football team represented Bryant College as a member of Northeast-10 Conference (NE-10) during the 2002 NCAA Division II football season. The Bulldogs were led by  fourth-year head coach Jim Miceli and played their home games at Bulldog Stadium. They finished the season 5–6 overall and 5–5 in NE-10 play.

Schedule

References

Bryant
Bryant Bulldogs football seasons
Bryant Bulldogs football